UNIGINE Company is a multinational software development company headquartered in Clemency, Luxembourg. It is well known for developing the UNIGINE Engine proprietary cross-platform middleware and advanced GPU benchmarks (Heaven, Valley and Superposition).

Main products 

 UNIGINE Engine (cross-platform 3D engine for simulators, virtual reality systems and computer games)
 Naval strategy Oil Rush

GPU benchmarks 

 Sanctuary v2.3 (2007-2010) – no longer supported;
 Tropics v1.3 (2007-2010) – included in the Phoronix Test Suite for Linux, no longer supported;
 Heaven v4.0 (2009-2013) – the first benchmark for DirectX 11, included in the Phoronix Test Suite for Linux;
 Valley v1.0 (2013);
 Superposition v1.1 (2017-2019).

History 
The development of UNIGINE technology began with the open source project Frustum, which was opened in 2004 by Alexander Zapryagaev, co-founder (along with Denis Shergin, CEO) and ex-CTO of UNIGINE company, as well as the lead developer of the UNIGINE Engine.

The name UNIGINE is an abbreviation for Unique Engine or Universal Engine.

See also
 Unigine Engine
 Oil Rush
 Linux gaming

References

External links 
 
Benchmarks home page

Companies established in 2017
Video game development companies